Living Lightning (Miguel Santos) is a fictional superhero appearing in American comic books published by Marvel Comics. He first appeared in Avengers West Coast #63, published  in October, 1990. The character was created by writers Dann Thomas and Roy Thomas and artist Paul Ryan.

He started out trying to clear the name of his father, Carlos Santos, by investigating the Legion of the Living Lighting. During his investigations a machine accidentally gave him the power to not only control lightning but also to turn into the human embodiment of lighting. He became a member of the Avengers West Coast and served with them during Operation: Galactic Storm. During the Civil War he sided with Captain America who was against super hero registration. At the end of the Civil War Living Lighting joined the 50 states initiative, becoming a member of Texas-based super-team, The Rangers that also include Firebird, Fifty-One, Red Wolf, Shooting Star and Texas Twister.

Publication history
Living Lightning first appeared in the story "When Lives the Lightning" in Avengers West Coast #63 (October, 1990), written by Dann Thomas and Roy Thomas, and illustrated by Paul Ryan. From 1991 to 1994, he began as an enemy of Avengers West Coast in Avengers West Coast #71–73 then became a member of the team and has made nineteen other appearances in this series with #74–80, #82, #84–90, #92, #96, #100, #102 and two in Avengers West Coast Annual #7–8.

In 1992, as an Avenger, he appeared in other titles of the crossover Operation: Galactic Storm with The Avengers #345, #347, Captain America #401, Quasar #33, Thor #445–446 and Wonder Man vol.2 #8–9.

During the same year, Miguel Santos played a role in the comic book limited series Infinity War with #1–3, 6 and several tie-ins. In 1993, he appeared in the sequel, Infinity Crusade with #1, #3–5 and the tie-in Web of Spider-Man with #104, #106.

In 1998, Living Lightning appeared in The Avengers #1–3.

In 2005, he made a brief appearance in GLA #2 written by Dan Slott, in which Living Lightning is revealed to be gay.

From 2006 to 2008, Miguel Santos played a role in the events of Civil War. He appeared in Civil War #4–6, The Amazing Spider-Man #537, Civil War: Battle Damage Report #1, Civil War: Front Line #11 and Civil War Chronicles #6. Living Lightning has been identified as one of the 142 registered superheroes who appear on the cover of the comic book Avengers: The Initiative #1. The character became a member of the Rangers and appeared in the issues #2 (July 2007) and #19 (January 2009) of this series.

In 2009, he made two appearances in the series Avengers Unconquered with the episodes #4 and #6. This series is a part of Marvel UK's 'Collectors' Edition' line. It is published by Panini Comics and reprints Marvel Comics from the United States.

In 2012, writer Chris Yost chose the Texas team the Rangers to come into conflict with Houston's new superhero Scarlet Spider in the story "The Second Master" in Scarlet Spider #7–9. In an interview with Comic Book Resources, at a question about the antagonists in the story, Chris Yost answered "You'll also be seeing a well known super-hero group from the American southwest named – wait for it – The Rangers! Texas Twister! Shooting Star! Red Wolf! Living Lightning! Firebird! Even a new hero or two! And spoiler alert – Scarlet Spider will fight them."

Living Lightning was featured as a main character during the 2018 storyline "No Surrender" in Avengers #675-690.

Living Lightning has also been depicted in two alternative universes with "What If the Avengers Lost Operation Galactic Storm?", What If...? #55–56 (1993) and with a brief appearance in "What if the Scarlet Witch Hadn't Acted Alone?", What If? Avengers Disassembled (2006).

The character has entries in The Official Handbook of the Marvel Universe: Master Edition #28 (1990), in The Official Handbook of the Marvel Universe: Avengers 2005 and also in The Marvel Encyclopedia (2006).

Fictional character biography 
Miguel Santos was born in East Los Angeles, California. Miguel's father, Carlos, was a member of an extremist group called the Legion of the Living Lightning. In a misguided attempt by the Legion to gain control of the Hulk, the group battled him. The Legion was thus destroyed, and Carlos was killed.

Hoping to salvage his father's name, high school student Miguel broke into the Legion's headquarters to learn more about their work.  While exploring, Miguel unwittingly turned on one of the Legion's machines and was transformed into a being of living energy. Initially, a confused Miguel clashed with the West Coast Avengers and was apparently killed during the conflict. Later, he turned up alive and was captured by the villain, Doctor Demonicus, and was coerced to join the Pacific Overlords. After a brief, unwilling foray into crime, Miguel aided the Avengers West Coast, and then joined the team. During his tenure with the Avengers West Coast, he teamed with heroes such as the Fantastic Four, Doctor Strange, Darkhawk, and Spider-Man. He battled villains such as Arkon and Thundra, the second Hangman, the Night Shift, Satannish, Death Web, Professor Power, and the Magus. Alongside the Avengers, he participated in the Kree/Shi'ar War. He eventually decided to become an Avengers reservist while attending college. While he occasionally serves with the team, Miguel gave up active membership to concentrate on his studies.

For a time, Miguel and his fellow Avenger Quasar manned a deep-space monitoring station. Their powers enabled them to travel back and forth to Earth without difficulty. Miguel took advantage of the isolation to study.

The Great Lakes Avengers (GLA) invited Miguel Santos in order to recruit him in their team. During the meeting, he turned them down, explaining that he'd attended thinking the team's acronym GLA referred to the Gay/Lesbian Alliance. With his explanation, he inadvertently revealed that he was gay to GLA member Flatman.

During the Civil War storyline, Miguel joined Captain America's Secret Avengers as one of twenty new members who opposed the Superhuman Registration Act. He worked with the team out of a series of safe houses set up by Nick Fury. He was part of the final battle between the two main sides. After Captain America surrendered to the authorities, Living Lightning became an Initiative recruit, joining the Texas Rangers.

During the Secret Invasion storyline, Living Lightning was with the Rangers when they, 3-D Man, and Ant-Man III were fighting a Skrull that was posing as Lobo.

After the Dark Reign storyline, Living Lightning was doing private security work for the Avengers; notably protecting the family of Avengers Academy student Striker.

Living Lightning was with the Rangers when they come into conflict with Kaine alias Scarlet Spider in Houston, then they joined forces with him to battle a monster made of pure energy. He has since left the Rangers and was inducted in the FBI, where he goes on several undercover missions.

During the Avengers: No Surrender story arc, Santos was the one responsible for making the Grandmaster back down and surrender the Avengers he had captured as part of the latest game through a daring bluff; by provoking the Grandmaster into a game of poker, Santos subsequently raised the stakes of the game until he reached a point where the stakes were that the loser would have all memory of their accomplishments wiped from the memories of all who knew of them, prompting Grandmaster to fold as he could not bear to lose everything like that whereas Santos accepted that being an Avenger meant doing the right thing because it was the right thing to do rather than because you would be remembered for it.

Sexuality

During his tenure in the West Coast Avengers, Miguel dated women. Later, though, Miguel was approached by members of the Great Lakes Avengers, who hoped to recruit them for their team. When he heard the team's acronym (GLA), Miguel mistook them for the Gay/Lesbian Alliance and inadvertently revealed that he was gay to GLA member Flatman.

Writer Dan Slott commented in an interview about his decision to out Living Lightning: "He's gay. Get over it. Previous girlfriends? Beards. Or relationships that just didn't work—because Miguel hadn't come to terms yet with who he really is. Miguel is a gay superhero and a wonderful role model."

Powers and abilities 
Living Lightning gained superhuman powers when he absorbed energy from an experimental lightning weapon. Living Lightning has the ability to transform his body into electrical plasma, in which form he can fly at sub-light speed, generate electrical power as shocks or bolts, and surround himself with a protective electrical force field. He has the ability to control his body while composed of electrical plasma, at which time his mind exists only in astral form.

In his true form, Living Lightning is just that, a sentient electrical force with no mass.  In this form, he can fly, reaching sub-light speeds, withstanding the vacuum of space, and is impervious to most physical and energy attacks.  He also possesses the ability to fire and manipulate bursts of electricity and electrical fields of varying intensities in his solid form, however, he must wear a special containment suit to retain a solid form.

Miguel has knowledge of basic street-fighting techniques. He is bilingual in Spanish and English.

References

External links 
 
 Miguel Santos (Earth-616) at Marvel Wikia
 Living Lightning at Gay League
 

Avengers (comics) characters
Characters created by Roy Thomas
Fictional characters from Los Angeles
Fictional gay males
Marvel Comics characters who can move at superhuman speeds
Marvel Comics LGBT superheroes
Marvel Comics mutates